Lovozero may refer to:
Lovozero Massif, a mountain range in the center of Kola Peninsula, Russia
Lake Lovozero, a lake in Murmansk Oblast, Russia
Lovozero (rural locality), a rural locality (a selo) in Murmansk Oblast, Russia
Lovozero (air base), a military air base in Murmansk, Russia